is a construction-oriented strategy video game that was released for both the Super Famicom, NEC PC-9801, Sharp X68000 and FM Towns.

Summary

The traditional definition of a leading company is a corporation that currently dominates the "corporate wars" against their competitors. Its employees are considered by most people to be winning the "rat race."

Both versions of this game were released only in the Japanese market. However, the NEC PC-9801 version has sharper graphics and the ability to use a mouse. Instead of abstract colors (to depict control of each square of the board), buildings are used to depict a typical Japanese residential neighborhood. A theme park is shown on an island in the PC-9801 version to depict recreational opportunities while the interior of the corporate headquarters is seen in the Sharp X68000 version.

The game challenges young people to create their own business empire by researching and marketing better VHS machines for the Japanese consumers. In both versions of the game, the player is introduced to jazzy instrumental song being played in the background while neon pictures of various people fly across the screen. As of 2021, there has been no attempt to produce an English language version for this game either through official channels or through unofficial emulator translator groups. This game is considered to be in Japanese for the full duration of the game, making literacy skills in Japanese mandatory. Only the brand names themselves use ASCII letters; all other words use the Japanese alphabet. There are only two time periods in the game and jazz music plays throughout the entire game.

The player can either start in the 1970s when VCRs were beginning to be researched in Japan or in the 1980s when VHS (and video cassette recorders) were beginning to come of age. Up to eight buildings can be constructed on the corporation's property to build and research new technology. However, three buildings are already established at the start of the game. Each product the player manufactures has a separate profit chart. When an older model goes down in profits, the player should research and manufacture a newer one (and discontinue the older one) and make more money from willing Japanese customers.

It is the job of the player to try to keep his chosen corporation profitable by creating new VHS machines while making sure that people still spend money on the ones being made. If they go down to zero or less, then the company goes bankrupt. At this point, the player loses the game. When a company goes bankrupt, a television news screen appears with the English word "DISSOLVED" on the picture caption.

References

External links
 NEC PC9801 images

1992 video games
Business simulation games
Japan-exclusive video games
Koei games
NEC PC-9801 games
X68000 games
Super Nintendo Entertainment System games
FM Towns games
Video games developed in Japan
Video games set in the 1970s
Video games set in the 1980s
Video games set in the 1990s
Video games set in Japan
Multiplayer and single-player video games